Willem Meijer (1923 – 22 October 2003) was a Dutch botanist and plant collector.

Background and education
Meijer was born in 1923 in The Hague, Netherlands. He received his Ph.D. from the University of Amsterdam in 1951. Meijer travelled to Java later that year and became the Assistant of the Herbarium Bogoriense (Bogor herbarium).

Early career
He returned to Europe for a short leave before going back to Indonesia in February 1955. There he lectured on botany at the Faculty of Agriculture, Pajakumbuh, Sumatra. In September 1956, Meijer was appointed the Professor of Botany at the institution. His expertise lay in hepaticology, although he also studied mosses, ferns, and spermatophytes

Borneo and America
Meijer was repatriated in 1958. From May 1959, he was employed by the Forest Department of North Borneo, stationed in Sandakan. From 1962 to 1963, he made a round-the-world trip, visiting herbaria in various countries. Meijer returned to Europe on leave again in 1966. In 1968, he was appointed Visiting Associate (later Associate) Professor at the University of Kentucky, Lexington. He stayed there until his death on 22 October 2003.

References

Nationaal Herbarium Nederland: Prof.dr. Willem ('Wim') Meijer

1923 births
2003 deaths
20th-century Dutch botanists
Scientists from The Hague
Dutch expatriates in Indonesia